Homage at Siesta Time (also known as Four Women for One Hero) is a 1962 Argentine-French-Brazilian drama film written and directed by Leopoldo Torre Nilsson. It is based on the play with the same name written by Beatriz Guido. It was entered into the main competition at the 23rd Venice International Film Festival.

Cast 
  Alida Valli as Constance
  Paul Guers  as Henri Balmant
  Alexandra Stewart  as Marianne
   Violeta Antier   as Lilian
   Luigi Picchi   as Aloysio
  Glauce Rocha  as Berenice
   Maurice Sarfati  as Lombardo

References

External links

1960 films
1960 drama films
Argentine drama films
Brazilian drama films
French drama films
Films directed by Leopoldo Torre Nilsson
French films based on plays
1960s Argentine films
1960s French films